Psalm 84 is the 84th psalm of the Book of Psalms. The Book of Psalms forms part of the Ketuvim section of the Hebrew Bible  and part of the Christian Old Testament. In the slightly different numbering system of the Greek Septuagint version of the bible, and in its Latin translations, the Vulgate, this psalm is Psalm 83. The psalm is a hymn psalm, more specifically a pilgrimage psalm, attributed to the sons of Korah.

In Latin, the psalm is known as "Quam dilecta tabernacula tua Domine virtutum". In the English of the King James Version it begins "How amiable are thy tabernacles, O Lord of hosts!".

The psalm forms a regular part of Jewish, Catholic, Lutheran, Anglican and other Protestant liturgies. It has often been set to music, notably in Schein's motet Wie lieblich sind deine Wohnungen  and by Johannes Brahms who included it in his Ein deutsches Requiem. The psalm was paraphrased in hymns. Dealing with the place where God lives, its beginning has been used as an inscription on synagogues and churches, and the psalm is sung for dedication ceremonies of buildings and their anniversaries.

Context 
Psalm 84 begins a group of psalms at the end of Book III within the 150 psalms, from this psalm to Psalm 89. These psalms attempt to provide hope to the exilic Israelite community, but despite their celebration of the historic traditions of the Jewish people, remind the reader that these elements no longer provide the hope they once did. Within this group, "Psalm 84 ties the presence of the divine to the temple."

Four psalms of this group, 84, 85, 87 and 88, are attributed to the Korahites, who are described as the doorkeepers of the tabernacle in the Book of Chronicles.

Background and themes 
The psalm could have been written before or after the exile in Babylon (6th century BCE). It is attributed to the sons of Korah, and was compiled by David into the Book of Psalms.

The psalm begins with a praise of the place where God lives, and where the singer longs to be. The psalm begins and ends addressing God as the Lord of Hosts, a divine epithet. The longing goes further than the place where God lives, yearning for the presence of the "living God". God is also identified with the sun, as "giver of life", and with a protective shield. God is called "my King and my God", the power behind life.

Originally, the desired place of God meant the Temple in Jerusalem. Some scholars believe that the psalm is written from the viewpoint of pilgrims on their way towards the temple, while others think that it dates from the time of the exile, longing to restore the destroyed temple. In Christian thinking, the place where God lives is often identified with Eternal life.

Augustine of Hippo wrote a detailed commentary. He explained, for example, that "For one day in Your courts is better than a thousand" meant one peaceful everlasting day near God is preferable to many days in the human condition. James Luther Mays comments in the book Psalms that Psalm 84 is especially beloved of all the psalms that contemplate God's dwelling, and notices that it contains three beatitudes.  The Hebrew (verse 6) has been translated as vale of tears or weeping and as valley of Baca.

Text

Hebrew Bible version 
The text in the original Hebrew begins with a verse treated as a subtitle in the King James Version. It is a musical direction for the conductor of the Levite musicians in the Temple in Jerusalem.

King James Version 
 How amiable are thy tabernacles, O Lord of hosts!
 My soul longeth, yea, even fainteth for the courts of the Lord: my heart and my flesh crieth out for the living God.
 Yea, the sparrow hath found a house, and the swallow a nest for herself, where she may lay her young, even thine altars, O Lord of hosts, my King, and my God.
 Blessed are they that dwell in thy house: they will be still praising thee. Selah.
 Blessed is the man whose strength is in thee; in whose heart are the ways of them.
 Who passing through the valley of Baca make it a well; the rain also filleth the pools.
 They go from strength to strength, every one of them in Zion appeareth before God.
 O Lord God of hosts, hear my prayer: give ear, O God of Jacob. Selah.
 Behold, O God our shield, and look upon the face of thine anointed.
 For a day in thy courts is better than a thousand. I had rather be a doorkeeper in the house of my God, than to dwell in the tents of wickedness.
 For the Lord God is a sun and shield: the Lord will give grace and glory: no good thing will he withhold from them that walk uprightly.
 O Lord of hosts, blessed is the man that trusteth in thee.

Uses

Judaism 
Verse 5 of the psalm, "Fortunate are those who stay in Your house; they will continually praise You forever", is the first of two introductory verses appended to the prayer commonly known as Ashrei (Psalm 145), which is recited twice during Shacharit (morning prayer service) and once during Mincha (afternoon prayer service). The first word of this verse, Ashrei ("Fortunate"), gives its name to the whole prayer.

Verse 13, "O Lord of Hosts, fortunate is the man who trusts in You", is the second of a triad of verses recited in the Vehu Rachum prayer in Pesukei dezimra, in Uva letzion, and at the beginning of Maariv (evening prayer service). According to tradition, the first verse in this group was recited by Abraham, this verse was recited by Isaac, and the third verse, was recited by Jacob–the three Jewish Patriarchs.

Verse 13 is also one of the verses of salvation and hope recited at the beginning of the Havdalah ceremony.

Catholicism 
The psalm is part of the Catholic rite of dedication of churches and altars.

Protestantism 
Just like in Catholicism, Psalm 84 was recommended for ceremonies to dedicate churches. The psalm has also been used for anniversaries of the dedication of churches, such as the 50th Kirchweihfest of the rebuilt Luisenkirche in Berlin-Charlottenburg, and the commemoration of 500 years Reformation in Munich. It is often the subject of sermons at such occasions, as by Jürgen Seidl in a service on 7 May 2006, celebrating 125 years of the Dreikönigskirche in Frankfurt, with the performance of Bach's cantata Gott der Herr ist Sonn und Schild, BWV 79, which quotes from it.

Historical usage
Thomas More wrote annotations in his Psalter for Psalm 84 while awaiting execution in the Tower of London, expressing his desire to be able to take part in Christian worship again.

During the Putten raid in October 1944, the Nazi occupiers of the Netherlands attacked the village of Putten and took nearly all of its male population to concentration camps, from which only a few returned alive. When deported, the village men sang Psalm 84. In an annual commemoration at the location every October since the war, a choir sings verses of the psalm.

On April 30, 1956, Senator Alben W. Barkley - who had been Vice President of the United States between 1949 and 1953 and who returned to the Senate after failing to gain the Presidency - gave the keynote address at the Washington and Lee Mock Convention.  Barkley spoke of his willingness, when returning to the Senate, to sit with the other freshman senators , though in his earlier Congressional career he had been a senior Senator and Majority Leader for many years. He ended with an allusion to Psalm 84:10, saying "I'm glad to sit on the back row, for I would rather be a servant in the House of the Lord than to sit in the seats of the mighty." He then collapsed onstage and died of a heart attack.

Musical settings 

Johann Hermann Schein composed a motet, using the beginning verses of Psalm 84 in the German translation by Martin Luther , Wie lieblich sind deine Wohnungen, in 1628. Heinrich Schütz set the psalm in German as part of his Op. 2, Psalmen Davids sampt etlichen Moteten und Concerten (Psalms of David with several motets and concertos). Henry Dumont, one setting in 1652, Marc-Antoine Charpentier, 2 settings, Quam dilecta: Psalmus David octogésimus tertius, H.167, for soloists, double chorus, flutes, strings and continuo (1675) and H.186, for 3 voices, 2 treble instruments and continuo (1680). Johann Sebastian Bach set verse 11 as the opening movement of his cantata Gott der Herr ist Sonn und Schild, BWV 79, written for Reformation Day 1725. Johann Justus Kahle set the psalm as one of four Psalm Cantatas for soprano, two oboes, two violins and continuo, for the dedication of the church in Ostrau.

Johannes Brahms included verses 1, 2 and 4 in German, "Wie lieblich sind deine Wohnungen" (How lovely are thy dwellings), as the fourth and central movement of his German Requiem, Ein deutsches Requiem, Op. 45. * Friedrich Kiel set the first 2 verses as No. 3 of his Six Motets, Op. 82, published in 1883.

Alexis de Castillon set a Paraphrase du Psaume 84 (Paraphrase of Psalm 84) by Louis Gallet for soloists, choir and orchestra as his Op. 17.

In 1913, Wilhelm Kempff composed a setting for choir a cappella for the cathedral choir in Berlin as his Op. 1. Katherine Kennicott Davis, the composer of the Christmas carol "The Little Drummer Boy", set verses 1–3 (How Lovely Are Thy Dwellings) for voice and piano or organ in 1952.

Several songs and hymns are based on Psalm 84 or contain part of it, for example the Dutch "Wat hou ik van uw huis" from Psalmen voor Nu.  wrote in 1798 a versed paraphrase for the Genfer Psalter, "Wie lieblich schön, Herr Zebaoth, ist deine Wohnung, o mein Gott", which appears in the Protestant hymnal Evangelisches Gesangbuch as EG 282. In 1834, Henry Francis Lyte wrote a hymn "Pleasant are thy courts above", a paraphrase of the psalm in four stanzas. Popular at the beginning of the 20th century, it is not very frequent in modern population. John Milton, the author of Paradise Lost, wrote a hymn in condensed form of four short stanzas, "How lovely are Thy dwellings fair!". Another hymn by Isaac Watts, first published in 1719, paraphrases the Psalm, beginning with "Lord of the worlds above". It was later re-published in collections such as Hymns Ancient and Modern.

Modern settings include "and the swallow" by Caroline Shaw, and "Better is One Day" by Matt Redman, which is based on verse 10. Philip Moore's anthem Lo! God is here! combines verses from Psalm 84 with John Wesley's translation of a hymn by Gerhard Tersteegen.

References

Cited sources

Further reading

External links 

 
 
 Psalms Chapter 84 תְּהִלִּים text in Hebrew and English, mechon-mamre.org
 Psalm 84 – The Pilgrim's Love and Longing for God and His House text and detailed commentary, enduringword.com
 For the leader; "upon the gittith." A psalm of the Korahites. text and footnotes, usccb.org United States Conference of Catholic Bishops
 PSAL. LXXXIV. translation by John Milton, dartmouth.edu
 Psalm 84:1 introduction and text, biblestudytools.com
 Charles H. Spurgeon: Psalm 84 detailed commentary, archive.spurgeon.org

084